Cadamy is an unincorporated community in Itawamba County, Mississippi, United States, located on Mississippi Highway 23 south of Tremont.

References 

Unincorporated communities in Itawamba County, Mississippi
Unincorporated communities in Mississippi